Guinea Equatorial Airlines (GEASA) is an airline based in Malabo, Equatorial Guinea. It was established and started operations in 1996 and operates domestic charter services. Its main base is Malabo International Airport.

The airline is on the list of air carriers banned in the European Union.

Fleet 
The Guinea Ecuatorial Airlines fleet includes the following aircraft (at February 2015):

3 Yakovlev Yak-40
1 Antonov An-72
1 Boeing 767-300ER (operated for CEIBA Intercontinental) (as of August 2016)

References 

Airlines of Equatorial Guinea
Airlines established in 1996
Malabo
1996 establishments in Equatorial Guinea